Mjimwema is an administrative ward in the Kigamboni District of the Dar es Salaam Region of Tanzania. According to the 2002 census, the ward has a total population of 9,087.

See also
Historic Swahili Settlements

References

Swahili people
Swahili city-states
Swahili culture
Temeke District
Wards of Dar es Salaam Region